Elachista orba is a moth in the family Elachistidae. It was described by Edward Meyrick in 1921. It is found on Java.

The length of the forewings is about 4 mm. The forewings are grey, irrorated with blackish and with an oblique streak of white irroration from the costa at three-fifths, reaching nearly to the tornus. The hindwings are grey.

References

Moths described in 1921
orba
Moths of Asia